The Esperanto Museum and Collection of Planned Languages, commonly known as the Esperanto Museum, is a museum for Esperanto and other constructed languages in Vienna, Austria. It was founded in 1927 by Hofrat Hugo Steiner and was incorporated into the Austrian National Library as an independent collection in 1928. Today, it is a museum, library, documentation center, and archive. It accommodates the largest collection of constructed languages in the world and a linguistic research library for language planning. Its catalogue is available online.

Since 2005, the museum has been located in the Baroque Palais Mollard-Clary. The museum holds around 35,000 library volumes, 3700 periodical titles, 3500 cultural artifacts, 10,000 autographs and manuscripts, 22,000 photographs and photographic negatives, 1500 posters, and 40,000 pamphlets. Overall, approximately 500 various planned languages are documented, of which the most important is Esperanto.

See also 

 Esperanto library
 The Ludwik Zamenhof Centre

External links

 Esperanto Museum 
 Collection of Planned Languages
 Scanned Esperanto-books
 Scanned Esperanto-journals

References 

Museums in Vienna
Esperanto organizations
Libraries in Vienna
History museums in Austria
Buildings and structures in Innere Stadt
Language museums
Museums established in 1927
Esperanto in Austria